Pete Taylor (April 1, 1945 in Des Moines, Iowa – March 5, 2003 in Iowa City, Iowa) was a radio and television sportscaster who worked for radio station KRNT and television station KCCI in Des Moines, Iowa.  Taylor also served as the play-by-play announcer for Iowa State University football and men's basketball.

The Voice of the Cyclones
Taylor began his association with Iowa State in 1970, covering Cyclone events for KRNT radio when he was KRNT (now KCCI)-TV's  sports director. Taylor was chosen Iowa Sportscaster of the Year four times during his career as the director of Des Moines' top-rated news telecast from 1969-90. In 1984, Iowa State signed a contract for exclusive broadcast rights for all sporting events with Clear Channel Communications. Taylor was picked alongside color man and partner Eric Heft, forming the broadcast tandem that spanned 24 years in basketball and 19 years in football.

Taylor worked 22 years as sports director at KCCI-TV in Des Moines prior to joining the Iowa State staff. In 1990, Taylor left KCCI to work full-time at Iowa State as director of athletic fundraising. He later was promoted to associate athletic director, serving as the department's liaison with men's basketball, football, the car program and special projects. Taylor also devoted time to Cyclone Club activities, including outings and banquets, and oversaw media relations and radio and television contracts.

In all, Taylor's contributions to Iowa State spanned four decades. In addition to his administrative and radio play-by-play duties, he also hosted the football coaches' TV Show, Cyclone Replay Show and radio call-in shows for both football and men's basketball.

Death

Taylor, who was in his 33rd season as the radio play-by-play "Voice of the Cyclones," died Wednesday March 5, 2003 at University Hospitals in Iowa City after a brain hemorrhage following surgery to treat complications from a stroke. He was 57.

Personal
Taylor was a 1963 graduate of Theodore Roosevelt High School in Des Moines, IA and a 1967 graduate of the University of Iowa, where he participated in baseball. He was known as a fan of funk and hip-hop music.  His hobbies included movies, music, books, games, watching and playing sports, and spending time with family and friends. He was survived by his mother Modesta, daughter Jill, son David and grandchildren Charlie, Lucy, Sam and Henry. He married his high school sweetheart (the former Susan Williams) in 1966 when they were students at University of Iowa in Iowa City, IA.

Pete Taylor Media Room
On December 9. 2011, the Iowa State Athletics Department officially dedicated the Pete Taylor Media Room in Hilton Coliseum.
Members of Taylor's family were present, and Iowa State Athletics Director Jamie Pollard, John Walters, Eric Heft and David Taylor gave remarks on Pete's immeasurable contributions toward Iowa State. The event featured a ribbon cutting ceremony, performed by Taylor's grandchildren, to open the state-of-the-art media center.

"By naming the media area, the Pete Taylor Media Room, we are able to honor one of our greatest icons," Pollard said. "Pete was loved by so many Cyclones and worked tirelessly in the news media business for years so we think this is a fitting tribute."

In 2004, the Taylor family introduced the Pete Taylor Memorial Scholarship, given annually to Iowa State students. This year's recipients, Andrew Sevcik of Des Moines, Patrick Tarbox of West Des Moines and Kayci Woodley of Coal Valley, Ill, were awarded $2,000 scholarships on behalf of Taylor's legacy. Pollard presented the scholarships to the recipients at the ceremony.

After the summer floods in 2010 destroyed the Hilton media workroom, the athletics department built a new media headquarters on the lower level. The fully equipped workspace bears the name of Taylor. The room includes a photo collage of Taylor as well as a plaque commemorating his achievements.

Media entering Hilton Coliseum will see a giant mural of Taylor as they walk downstairs to the room. The mural, which is visible from the concourse, includes photos of Taylor spanning his time as a Cyclone ambassador.

References

1945 births
2003 deaths